Sérgio Ricardo dos Santos Júnior, commonly known as Serginho (born 3 December 1990 in Santos, São Paulo), is a Brazilian footballer who plays as a midfielder for Korean club Daegu FC.

Club career
Serginho played in the youth Santos team for eight years and served in only one game as a professional in 2010. In 2011, on loan to Red Bull, participated in the team that won the Paulistão A-3.

In the Oeste since 2011, earned the title of the Interior and access to the Brazilian Série C (both in 2011). And in 2012 helped the team who won the Série C.

In Palmeiras made his debut on 4 July 2013 in the match against Avaí. On 18 March 2015, Serginho signed a three-year contract with Kazakhstan Premier League side FC Kairat.

In January 2016, Serginho returned to Brazil, signing a year-long contract with Ceará Sporting Club.

Career statistics

Honours

Santos
 Campeonato Paulista: 2010

Red Bull
 Campeonato Paulista Série A3: 2011

Oeste
 Campeonato Paulista do Interior: 2011
 Campeonato Brasileiro Série C: 2012

Palmeiras
 Campeonato Brasileiro Série B: 2013

References

External links

Profile at Matsumoto Yamaga

1990 births
Living people
Sportspeople from Santos, São Paulo
Brazilian footballers
Association football midfielders
Campeonato Brasileiro Série A players
Campeonato Brasileiro Série B players
J1 League players
J2 League players
Santos FC players
Red Bull Brasil players
Oeste Futebol Clube players
Sociedade Esportiva Palmeiras players
Kazakhstan Premier League players
FC Kairat players
Matsumoto Yamaga FC players
Daegu FC players
Brazilian expatriate footballers
Brazilian expatriate sportspeople in Kazakhstan
Brazilian expatriate sportspeople in Japan
Brazilian expatriate sportspeople in South Korea
Expatriate footballers in Kazakhstan
Expatriate footballers in Japan
Expatriate footballers in South Korea